
Year 218 BC was a year of the pre-Julian Roman calendar. At the time it was known as the Year of the Consulship of Scipio and Longus (or, less frequently, year 536 Ab urbe condita). The denomination 218 BC for this year has been used since the early medieval period, when the Anno Domini calendar era became the prevalent method in Europe for naming years.

Events 
 By place 

 Hispania 
Second Punic War
 Fall of Saguntum to Hannibal of Carthage
 Hannibal sets out with around 40,000 men and 50 elephants from New Carthage (Cartagena) to northern Spain and then into the Pyrenees where his army meets with stiff resistance from the Pyrenean tribes. This opposition and the desertion of some of his Spanish troops greatly diminishes his numbers, but he reaches the river Rhône facing little resistance from the tribes of southern Gaul.

 A Roman army under the consul Publius Cornelius Scipio is transported by sea to Massilia (modern Marseille) to prevent Hannibal from advancing on Italy, but returns to Italy on learning Hannibal has already crossed the river
 A Roman army under Gnaeus Cornelius Scipio Calvus invades Spain.

 Roman Republic 
Second Punic War
 A Roman army, under consul, Tiberius Sempronius Longus, assembles in Sicily to embark for Northern Africa. Longus managed to capture Malta from the Carthaginians.
 Hannibal's crossing of the Alps: Hannibal took 38 North African war elephants across the alps from Gaul into Cisalpine Gaul to invade Rome. Almost none of the elephants survived the harsh conditions of the Alps. This led to the Romans cancelling their invasion of Africa.
 Battle of Ticinus: Hannibal defeats Scipio.
 The Roman Senate orders Sempronius Longus to travel from Sicily to reinforce Scipio's troops.
 December 18: Battle of the Trebia: Hannibal defeats the combined Roman armies under Sempronius and Scipio.

 Seleucid Empire 
 Fourth Syrian War
 Negotiations between the new Egyptian King Ptolemy IV and the Seleucid King Antiochus III collapse, and Antiochus III renews his advance, overrunning Ptolemy's forward defences, and gaining territory in Lebanon, Palestine and Phoenicia.

Births

Deaths

References